Badar Ali Rashid Ali Al Alawi (born 12 August 1990) is an Omani footballer who plays as a winger or attacker for Krabi FC.

Career

Al-Alawi started his career with Omani lower league side Yanqul SC.
After that, he signed for Al Nahda in the Omani top flight after receiving interest from Spain and suffering a broken leg. Before the 2018 season, Al-Alawi signed for Kamphaeng Phet in the Thai third tier after playing in Malaysia and Hong Kong. Before the 2019 season, he signed for Thai third tier club Bangkok FC.

In 2020, he signed for Ranong in the Thai second tier. Before the second half of 2020–21, Al-Alawi signed for Thai second tier team Khon Kaen. In 2021, he signed for Chainat in Thailand. In 2022, he signed for Thai outfit Krabi FC.

References

External links

 

1990 births
Al-Nahda Club (Oman) players
Association football forwards
Association football wingers
Badar Al-Alawi
Badar Al-Alawi
Expatriate footballers in Thailand
Badar Al-Alawi
Badar Al-Alawi
Living people
Oman Professional League players
Omani expatriate footballers
Omani footballers
Badar Al-Alawi
Badar Al-Alawi